There are at least 63 named waterfalls in Idaho as listed in the Geographic Names Information System by the U.S. Geological Survey.
 Albeni Falls, Bonner County, Idaho, el.  
 Auger Falls, Twin Falls County, Idaho, el.  
 Baron Creek Falls, Boise County, Idaho, el.  
 Bear Creek Falls, Adams County, Idaho, el.  
 Big Drops, Lincoln County, Idaho, el.  
 Big Falls, Boise County, Idaho, el.  
 Bridal Veil Falls, Custer County, Idaho, el.  
 Bull Run Creek Falls, Clearwater County, Idaho, el.  
 Camel Falls, Owyhee County, Idaho, el.  
 Caribou Falls, Boundary County, Idaho, el.  
 Char Falls, Bonner County, Idaho, el.  
 Copper Falls, Boundary County, Idaho, el.  
 Crane Falls (historical), Elmore County, Idaho, el.  
 Dagger Falls, Valley County, Idaho, el.  
 Deadman Falls, Elmore County, Idaho, el.  
 Devils Washboard Falls, Gooding County, Idaho, el.  
 Devlin Falls, Lemhi County, Idaho, el.  
 Elk Creek Falls, Clearwater County, Idaho, el.  
 Fall Creek Falls, Bonneville County, Idaho, el.  
 Fern Falls, Boise County, Idaho, el.  
 Fern Falls, Shoshone County, Idaho, el.  
 Goat Falls, Custer County, Idaho, el.  
 Grouse Creek Falls, Bonner County, Idaho, el.  
 Hazard Falls, Idaho County, Idaho, el.  
 Jump Creek Falls, Owyhee County, Idaho, el.  
 Lady Face Falls, Custer County, Idaho, el.  
 Little Drops, Lincoln County, Idaho, el.  
 Little Falls, Boise County, Idaho, el.  
 Lost Creek Falls, Adams County, Idaho, el.  
 Lower Mesa Falls, Fremont County, Idaho, el.  
 Lower Salmon Falls, Gooding County, Idaho, el.  
 Mallard Creek Falls, Idaho County, Idaho, el.  
 McAbee Falls, Bonner County, Idaho, el.  
 Mission Falls, Bonner County, Idaho, el.  
 Moyie Falls, Boundary County, Idaho, el.  
 Napias Creek Falls, Lemhi County, Idaho, el.  
 Patsy Ann Falls, Idaho County, Idaho, el.  
 Perrine Coulee Falls, Twin Falls County, Idaho, el.  
 Phantom Falls, Cassia County, Idaho, el.  
 Pillar Falls, Twin Falls County, Idaho, el.  
 Rambiker Falls, Shoshone County, Idaho, el.  
 Ross Falls, Twin Falls County, Idaho, el.  
 Rush Falls, Washington County, Idaho, el.  
 Salmon Falls, Idaho County, Idaho, el.  
 Salmon Falls, Twin Falls County, Idaho, el.  
 Selway Falls, Idaho County, Idaho, el.  
 Shadow Falls, Shoshone County, Idaho, el.  
 Sheep Falls, Fremont County, Idaho, el.  
 Sheep Falls, Fremont County, Idaho, el.  
 Shoestring Falls, Idaho County, Idaho, el.  
 Shoshone Falls, Twin Falls County, Idaho, el.  
 Smith Falls, Boise County, Idaho, el.  
 Smith Falls, Boundary County, Idaho, el.  
 Snow Creek Falls, Boundary County, Idaho, el.  
 The Falls, Caribou County, Idaho, el.  
 The Falls, Owyhee County, Idaho, el.  
 Torrelle Falls, Bonner County, Idaho, el.  
 Twin Falls, Jerome County, Idaho, el.  
 Upper Mesa Falls, Fremont County, Idaho, el.  
 Upper Priest Falls, Boundary County, Idaho, el.  
 Upper Salmon Falls, Twin Falls County, Idaho, el.  
 Wildhorse Falls, Adams County, Idaho, el.

Notes

See also

 List of Idaho rivers
 List of longest streams of Idaho
 Lost streams of Idaho
 Snake River Plain (ecoregion)
 Snake River Plain
 List of lakes of Idaho

Idaho